Two sculptures of beehives are installed outside the Utah State Capitol in Salt Lake City, Utah, United States. The artworks were presented to the state by the Kennecott Copper Corporation on July 24, 1976.

See also
 Insects in art

References

External links

 

Utah State Capitol
Outdoor sculptures in Utah
Insects in art